Westshore Palms is a neighborhood within the city limits of Tampa, Florida. As of the 2000 census the neighborhood had a population of 1,430. The ZIP Code serving the neighborhood is 33609. The neighborhood is close to Westshore Plaza and the Westshore Business District.

Geography
The boundaries of Westshore Palms are Interstate 275 to the north, Lois Avenue to the east, Kennedy Blvd. to the south, and Westshore Blvd. to the west.

Demographics
Source: Hillsborough County Atlas

At the 2000 census there were 1,430 people and 809 households residing in the neighborhood. The population density was  7,285/mi2.  The racial makeup of the neighborhood was 83.0% White, 8.0% African American, 0.0% Native American, 5.0% Asian, less than 1.0% from other races, and 3.0% from two or more races. Hispanic or Latino of any race were 24.0%.

Of the 809 households 8% had children under the age of 18 living with them, 18% were married couples living together, 4% had a female householder with no husband present, and 11% were non-families. 52% of households were made up of individuals.

The age distribution was 12% under the age of 18, 20% from 18 to 34, 27% from 35 to 49, 17% from 50 to 64, and 24% 65 or older. For every 100 females, there were 98 males.

The per capita income for the neighborhood was $21,160. About 13.0% of the population were below the poverty line, including 4% of those under age 18.

See also
Neighborhoods in Tampa, Florida

References

External links
Westshore Palms Civic Association, Inc.

Neighborhoods in Tampa, Florida